Henry and Dizzy is a 1942 American comedy film directed by Hugh Bennett and written by Val Burton. The film stars Jimmy Lydon, Mary Anderson, Charles Smith, John Litel, Olive Blakeney and Maude Eburne. The film was released on June 5, 1942, by Paramount Pictures.

Plot

Cast 
Jimmy Lydon as Henry Aldrich
Mary Anderson as Phyillis Michael
Charles Smith as Dizzy Stevens
John Litel as Mr. Sam Aldrich
Olive Blakeney as Mrs. Mary Aldrich
Maude Eburne as Mrs. Bradley
Vaughan Glaser as Mr. Bradley
Shirley Coates as Jennie Kilmer
Olin Howland as Mr. Stevens 
Minerva Urecal as Mrs. Kilmer
Trevor Bardette as Mr. Weeks
Carl Switzer as Billy Weeks
Warren Hymer as Tramp
Noel Neill as Jean
Jane Cowan as Pamela Rogers
Eleanor Counts as Dizzy's Girl
Isabel Withers as Mrs. Stevens
Frank Orth as Joe McGuire
Edgar Dearing as Police Sergeant McElroy
Mary Currier as Mrs. Michael
William Wright as Announcer
Anne O'Neal as Mr. Stevens' Secretary

References

External links 
 

1942 films
The Aldrich Family films
American black-and-white films
Paramount Pictures films
American comedy films
1942 comedy films
Films scored by Leigh Harline
Films produced by Sol C. Siegel
1940s English-language films
Films directed by Hugh Bennett
1940s American films